Keegan Christopher Bach (born April 20, 2001), known professionally as KBeaZy, is an American record producer, songwriter, and YouTuber. He quickly rose to fame in 2017 after reproducing the instrumental from XO TOUR Llif3 on YouTube and following up by making beat tutorials and live streaming some of them. He is also known for producing various beats for established artists. His eponymous YouTube channel has racked up over 130,000 subscribers and over 12 million views. Since his rise to fame, KBeaZy has most notably produced songs for Juice Wrld, Kehlani, Iann Dior, Roddy Ricch, and more recently earned a top #1 hit on the Billboard Hot 100 chart with "Mood" by 24kGoldn.

Career 
At age 19, KBeaZy relocated to Los Angeles to pursue his passion for music full time. Frequent collaborators include rappers 24kGoldn, Iann Dior and The Kid Laroi, as well as fellow record producers Omer Fedi and Blake Slatkin. KBeaZy was named the youngest producer ever to secure a Billboard #1 record with "Mood", which now has over 1 billion streams on Spotify.

Notable credits

References

External links 
 https://genius.com/artists/Kbeazy
 https://www.allmusic.com/artist/keegan-bach-mn0003876609

Living people
2000 births
American hip hop record producers